Andrei Esipov (born May 9, 1980) is a Russian professional ice hockey player who currently plays with Scorpions de Mulhouse in the Ligue Magnus. He previously played in the Russian Superleague and the Kontinental Hockey League for Krylya Sovetov Moscow, Lokomotiv Yaroslavl, Torpedo Nizhny Novgorod, HC Lada Togliatti, Metallurg Novokuznetsk and Severstal Cherepovets. He played the 2014–15 season in the FFHG Division 1 with Boxers de Bordeaux in France and won promotion to the Ligue Magnus that season.

References

External links

1980 births
Living people
Boxers de Bordeaux players
HC Donbass players
HC Lada Togliatti players
Krylya Sovetov Moscow players
Lokomotiv Yaroslavl players
Metallurg Novokuznetsk players
Russian ice hockey defencemen
Severstal Cherepovets players
Scorpions de Mulhouse players
Sokol Krasnoyarsk players
Ice hockey people from Moscow
Torpedo Nizhny Novgorod players